Jocelyn Merlen (born 24 November 1972) is a French former footballer who played as a right-back.

Career 
Merlen never played in a professional division during his career, but participated in the 2000 Coupe de France final with Calais RUFC. The final score eventually turned out to be a 2–1 victory in the favor of Nantes. Earlier in the tournament, he scored the game-winning goal off a free-kick in their 2–1 win over top-flight Strasbourg in the quarter-finals.

He participated in a commemorative rematch against Nantes 20 years later at the Stade de l'Épopée in Calais.

Honours 
Calais
 Coupe de France runner-up: 1999–2000

References

External links
 

1972 births
Living people
French footballers
Association football defenders
Calais RUFC players
USL Dunkerque players
Union Sportive Gravelines Football players
Championnat National players
Championnat National 2 players
Championnat National 3 players
French football managers
Sportspeople from Calais
Footballers from Hauts-de-France